Jack White was a former Australian professional soccer player who last played as a half-back for Cairns. Often considered a versatile player, he was a selection three times for the Australia national soccer team.

Club career
White first joined Nambour from the early 1920s to 1923, where he began his international career in 1923. He moved to Brisbane to play with Pineapple Rovers in 1923 for two years. On 23 September 1925, he joined Cairns.

International career
White began his international career with Australia in 1923 on their second historic tour against New Zealand, debuting in a 2–1 win over New Zealand. This was to be Australia's first win in an international match.

He played his final international match against Canada in June 1924.

Career statistics

International

References

Australian soccer players
Association football midfielders
Australia international soccer players